Zviahel Raion is a raion (district) of Zhytomyr Oblast, northern Ukraine. Its administrative centre is located at Zviahel. Population: 

On 18 July 2020, as part of the administrative reform of Ukraine, the number of raions of Zhytomyr Oblast was reduced to four, and the area of Novohrad-Volynskyi Raion was significantly expanded. The January 2020 estimate of the raion population was 

Originally named Novohrad-Volynskyi Raion; the Ukrainian parliament renamed  the raion Zviahel Raion, simultaneously approving the renaming of the city Zviahel, on 16 November 2022.

Brief 
It is located in western part of region. Distance from the district to the regional center Zviahel is 87 km by railway and of highways ways.

Natural tourist objects 

There is a number of the reserves in a district: “Horodnytskyi”, “Kazyava”, “Tuhanivskyi”, Chervonovilskyi” (all- national value), “Botanical”, “Myheivskyi”, “Sapozhynskyi”, “Storozhivskyi”, “Veresna”, “Klenovskyi”(local value), sight of nature of national value “Larch”, sight of landscape-gardening art of national value is Horodnytskyi park (ХІХ century), dendropark “Pilyava” (local value).
River Sluch has numerous of thresholds and is interesting for the supporters of water tourism (the route of the second category of complication passes through this route).

Social and historical tourist objects 

There are numerous of sights of local value in a district: synagogue (ХІХ-ХХcenturies), the church of St. Anthony beginning of the  ХХ century, St. George's church (1903); of the Virgin Protectress church and bell tower (1794, 1847) in v. Barvinovka, post-house (1854–58) in v. Bronyky, the church of St. John the Theologian (1912) in v. Mala Horbasha; Michael's church (1901) in v. Serednia Derazhnia; Intercession church (1907–11) in v. Yarun, Michael's church (1913) in v. Zholobne; the Ascension’s church (1901) in v. Ivashkivka; Roman Catholic church (ХІХ century) in v. Lebedivka.
In 1846 a famous Ukrainian poet Taras Shevchenko stayed at Hulsk. In honour of this event a memorable sign was set on the bank of the river Sluch.
In Hulsk and other villages of the district along an old state boundary there were fortifications buildings (pillboxes, bunkers) of times of Second world war (“line of Stalin”), which are the objects of tourism.

The natives of district 

 German writer Herbert Henke (v. Aneta); 
 doctor of Philological S. Zaika (v. Borysivka); 
 writer О.Sobkovych (v. Velyka Derazhnia); 
 dancer, the Honoured Artist of Ukraine Ye. Avramcuk (Horodnytsia); 
 writer from the Diaspora P. Volynyak (v. Hulsk); 
 writers М. Tkachuk (v. Zholobne), М. Karplyuk (v. Pyshchiv); 
 the specialist in study of flora and geobotanist V. Artemchuk (v. Koseniv); 
 ballet-master, people's artist of Ukraine R.Malynovskyi (v. Lebedivka); 
 poet О. Prokopchuk (v. Suhovolia); 
 composer B.Melnychuk (v. Tarashchanka); 
 singer, the Honoured Artist of Ukraine  G. Serheyeva (v. Tokarivka).

Villages
 

Berestivka
Budysko

References

External links
  Find out Novograd-Volynskiy District @ Ukrainian.Travel {en}

Raions of Zhytomyr Oblast
 
1923 establishments in Ukraine